The following human polls make up the 2012 NCAA Division I men's baseball rankings.  The USAToday/ESPN Coaches Poll is voted on by a panel of 31 Division I baseball coaches.  The Baseball America poll is voted on by staff members of the Baseball America magazine.  These polls rank the top 25 teams nationally.  Collegiate Baseball and the National Collegiate Baseball Writers Association rank the top 30 teams nationally.

Legend

ESPN/USA Today Coaches' Poll

Baseball America Poll

Collegiate Baseball Poll

The Collegiate Baseball Preseason poll ranks the top 40 teams, while each subsequent week ranks the top 30.  This table shows only the top 30.

NCBWA Poll

The NCBWA Preseason Poll ranks the top 35 teams, while each subsequent week ranks the top 30.  This table only shows the top 30 of the Preseason Poll

References

Rankings
College baseball rankings in the United States